Cho Huan Lai Memorial or also known as Keningau War Memorial in the Malaysian town of Keningau in Sabah is a monument dedicated to Chinese Consul General Cho Huan Lai and his colleagues who died on 6 July 1945 after being executed by the Japanese.

History 
When the Japanese invaded Sandakan on 19 January 1942, the Chinese Consulate was one of their first targets. Cho Huan Lai, who was the Chinese Consul General for the Republic of China in North Borneo since 1940 was arrested during the invasion. Shortly before the Japanese came to the consulate, Cho managed to destroy a number of consulate documents and other decipherment. Because of his diplomatic immunity, Cho along with several other Europeans sent to an internment camp in Berhala Island before being moved together with his family to the Batu Lintang camp in Kuching. He used his connections to keep in contact with his outside inmates. But when the Japanese got to know about it, all of his inmates was arrested in May 1944 along with him. The Japanese military court sentence them to imprisonment, in which they were serving their first period in a prison in Kuching, and later in Batu Tiga prison in Jesselton.

When the Allies launched an attack on the Japanese, some of his inmates were killed during an air raid on the prison in late 1944, with Cho was also wounded. In January 1945, the Japanese moved their prison to Beaufort and on 12 April 1945, it was moved to Keningau. After another series of bombing to other prison, all prisoners was taken to Bulu Silau, which about two miles from Keningau. In Keningau, Cho came under the command of Lt. Col. Abe Keichi, the Japanese military commander of Keningau, and Lieutenant Akutagawa Mitsuya, the commander of the local kenpeitai. On 5 July, the Japanese planned to dismiss them because they had fully served the sentence.

Since none of them were still alive at the end of the war, inquiries were made as to their whereabouts. It turned out that the men were taken to an airfield in Keningau under the pretext of relocation to Ranau and located near the airfield (about two miles from the Japanese General Lieutenant Abe's headquarters) where they been executed on 6 July 1945. After the war, the British government was keen to get on the exact locations of whereabouts of Cho and his European companions. The plan was supported and conducted by Richard Evans, the former residents of the West Coast Division. In October 1945, his search led him to Keningau where he discovered the graves of Cho, Stokes and others. Although the Japanese Commander of Abe Keichi and Lieutenant Akutagawa Mitsuya denied their role in the execution of Cho, both of them were found guilty and sentenced to death by hanging. The sentence was carried out in Changi Prison in Singapore. The remains of Cho and his colleagues was later reburied at the old Anglican Cemetery of Jesselton.

Location 

The monument is located near the former airfield of Keningau where Cho and his colleagues been executed.

The monument is shaped like a towering stele of about 4 metres in height. The cross section is rectangular; the entrance facing the wider side with red ancient Chinese character given a slightly concave. At the bottom of the monument is a slightly wider rectangular block with bronze plate, which described the information in English. The monument is placed on a three-tiered, square stepped pedestal.

The memorial inscription in large red ancient Chinese characters translated as:

The bronze plaque listed the names of the people executed here, namely:
 Cho Huan Lai – Consul General of the Republic of China.
 Cyril Drummond Le Gros Clark – Chief Secretary of the Rajah of Sarawak.
 Valentine A. Stokes – Medical practitioner, Sandakan.
 Henry William Webber – Engineer, Manila.
 Donald Macdonald – Planter, Kuching, Sarawak.

Above the English language bronze plaque is a marble slab inserted into the monument with an inscription in Chinese language:

References

Literature 
 Danny Wong Tze Ken: Historical Sabah: The War, Opus Publications Kota Kinabalu, 2010, 

Monuments and memorials in Sabah
World War II memorials